Saint Philotheos (died 5 May 1380) was a Coptic Orthodox martyr and saint.

Philotheos was born in Durunka, in the province of Assiut. He was tortured by the Muslims in an attempt to force him to renounce Christianity and embrace Islam. He refused and was eventually martyred on 2 Pashons, 1096 A.M. (5 May 1380)

References

Coptic Orthodox saints
Christians executed for refusing to convert to Islam
1380 deaths
14th-century Christian saints
14th-century Christian martyrs
Christian saints killed by Muslims
Year of birth unknown
Persecution of Oriental Orthodox Christians